Samsung Card Co, Ltd. (Hangul: 삼성카드) is a South Korean credit card company. Samsung Card was established in 1988 as a technical and business company licensed by Samsung Electronics. Headquartered in Seoul, South Korea, Samsung Card merged with Samsung Capital in 2004. The company is owned by Samsung Life Insurance (71.9%). By the end of 2017, the number of individual credit card users was 9.64 million, and the asset value of products was 21,181.9 billion won. Total billings (cumulative) in 2017 is 122,217.3 billion won.

See also
Economy of South Korea
Samsung Group

References

External links
Samsung Card Homepage

Card
Financial services companies of South Korea
Financial services companies established in 1988
Companies listed on the Korea Exchange